Dryadorchis is a genus of flowering plants from the orchid family, Orchidaceae. It is endemic to New Guinea.

Description
The stems are very short, and they bear subfalcate leaves. The racemose inflorescences have a swollen rhachis. They produce short-lived flowers with a long, slim column, which houses four pollinia. The unspurred labellum has a concavity in its centre.

Etymology
The genus name of Dryadorchis refers to Dryad, a tree nymph or tree spirit in Greek mythology.

Ecology
Dryadorchis grows epiphytically at elevations of 0-1700 m above sea level.

Taxonomy

Proposed merging with other genera
It was proposed to merge this genus with Sarcochilus and Thrixspermum, which however was rejected.

Species
It contains 5 known species, which are all endemic to New Guinea:

Dryadorchis barbellata Schltr. 
Dryadorchis dasystele Schuit. & de Vogel
Dryadorchis huliorum (Schuit.) Christenson & Schuit.
Dryadorchis minor Schltr.
Dryadorchis singularis (J.J.Sm.) Christenson & Schuit.

See also 
 List of Orchidaceae genera

References

External links 

Vandeae genera
Aeridinae
Endemic flora of New Guinea